is a multi-purpose stadium in Chiba, Chiba, Japan. It is currently used mostly for football matches. The stadium holds 30,000 people.

References

External links
 About the stadium 

Football venues in Japan
Athletics (track and field) venues in Japan
Multi-purpose stadiums in Japan
Sports venues in Chiba (city)
Sports venues completed in 1966
1966 establishments in Japan